Keith Anthony Savin (5 June 1929 – 1992) was an English professional footballer who played in the Football League for Derby County and Mansfield Town.

References

1929 births
1992 deaths
English footballers
Association football defenders
English Football League players
Oxford City F.C. players
Mansfield Town F.C. players
Derby County F.C. players
Nuneaton Borough F.C. players
Bourne Town F.C. players